Claytor Lake State Park is a  state park in Pulaski County, Virginia. The reservoir is named for W. Graham Claytor (1886–1971) of nearby Roanoke, a former vice president of Appalachian Power who supervised construction of the dam and creation of the lake.

Claytor Lake State Park has hiking trails, a freshwater swimming beach, boating and fishing opportunities, a full-service marina, visitor center, concession, lakeside cabins, camping with full hookups, interpretive programs and six rental shelters accommodating large groups. In addition to this, many housing projects have been created around the area due to the enticing lake-front properties.

The Haven B. Howe House is used as a Nature Exhibit Center that focuses on the lake's wildlife habitat. It was added to the National Register of Historic Places in 2008.

References

External links 

Claytor Lake State Park (Virginia)
Wildernet.com Claytor Lake State Park webpage
Claytor Lake web portal

State parks of Virginia
Parks in Pulaski County, Virginia
Nature centers in Virginia